Maurice Pic (23 March 1866, in Marrigny near Digoin – 29 December 1957, in Les Guerreaux) was a French entomologist who specialised in Coleoptera. He contributed to Mary-Louis Fauconnet's Catalogue raisonné des coléoptères de Saône-et-Loire (Le Creusot, Martet, 1887) and wrote many short papers, many in L'Échange, Revue Linnéenne describing world beetles. His most important work was for Sigmund Schenkling's still very relevant Coleopterorum Catalogus.

Pic's collection is in the Muséum national d'histoire naturelle in Paris.

Works
Excluding short papers.

1898–1934. Matériaux pour servir a l'étude des Longicornes. Cahiers 1–11, 120 pages
1902. Coleoptera Heteromera Fam. Hylophilidae. P. Wytsman (ed.), Genera Insectorum. Fascicule 8. P. Wytsman, Brussels, 14 pages, 1 pl.
Parts 14. Hylophilidae (1911); 26. Scraptiidae, Pedilidae (1911); 36. Anthicidae (1911); 41. Ptinidae (1912); 48. Anobiidae (1912); 55. Bruchidae (1913); 58. Dascillidae, Helodidae, Eucinetidae (1914); 81. Rhipiceridae (1925); 87. Phloeophilidae, Rhadalidae, Prionoceridae (1926); 94. Phengodidae, Karumiidae (1927); 103. Dasytidae: Melyrinae (1929); 155. Dasytidae: Dasytinae (1937) of  Schenkling S. (ed.), Coleopterorum Catalogus. W. Junk, Berlin.

Periodicals
He published 3 periodicals:
 L'Échange, 1885–1956, 543 issues
 Mélanges Exotico-Entomologiques, 1911–1939, 71 issues
 Opuscula Martialis, 1940–1944, 13 issues

References 
Constantin (R.), 1992 – Memorial des Coléopteristes Français. Bull. liaison Assoc. Col. reg. parisienne, Paris (Suppl. 14) Portrait  
Lhoste (J.), 1987 – Les entomologistes français. 1750–1950. INRA (Institut National de la Recherche Agronomique), Paris.
Pic (M.), 1942 – Mon jubilé entomologique

French entomologists
1866 births
1957 deaths
Coleopterists